George Browne (born 28 April 1934) is a former West Indian cricket umpire. He stood in one ODI game in 1988.

See also
 List of One Day International cricket umpires

References

1934 births
Living people
West Indian One Day International cricket umpires